Du style galant au style méchant is an opera cycle written for radio by composer Germaine Tailleferre and librettist Denise Centore. The cycle consistes of five short one act French language chamber operas, each one written to parody a different operatic form or style. The four surviving operas are La fille d'opéra (a parody of Jean-Philippe Rameau), Le bel ambitieux (a parody of Gioachino Rossini), La pauvre Eugénie (a parody of Gustave Charpentier), and Monsieur Petit Pois achète un château (a parody of Jacques Offenbach). The cycle had its world premiere on December 28, 1955 in a performance by the Radiodiffusion-Télévision Française.

The cast included Magali Arnault-Stanczak, Kimy McLaren, Jean-Michel Richer, and Dominique Côté.

References

1955 operas
French-language operas
Operas
Chamber operas
Compositions by Germaine Tailleferre
Opera cycles
Radio operas